Parmatergus is a genus of East African orb-weaver spiders first described by M. Emerit in 1994.  it contains only three species, all found in Madagascar.

References

Araneidae
Araneomorphae genera
Spiders of Madagascar